Vijay Kalyanji Shah (born 5 June 1959) is a music composer of Bollywood spanning a career over three decades(1986-Present). He is the son of veteran music director Kalyanji Virji Shah of the composer duo Kalyanji Anandji.

Career
Viju Shah is the son of music director Kalyanji (of the Kalyanji Anandji duo).

Viju Shah made his official debut with Rajiv Rai's Tridev (1989). 

He again teamed up with Rajiv Rai in for the 1992 film Vishwatma.

Viju Shah composed the background score for the horror thriller Junoon (1992) and the musical comedy Andaz Apna Apna (1994).

Viju Shah & Rajiv Rai collaborated in Mohra (1994). The film features the iconic songs “Tu Cheez Badi Hai Mast” and “Tip Tip Barsa Pani”. The music album went on to become the second highest-selling Bollywood soundtrack album of the year, having sold more than 8million units, ⁣ behind only Hum Aapke Hain Koun. 

After the success of Mohra, Viju Shah would go on to compose Ravan Raaj: A True Story and Tere Mere Sapne in 1995.

His 5th collaboration with Rajiv Rai was Gupt (1997).

Viju Shah ended the millennium with David Dhawan's comedy Bade Miyan Chote Miyan (1998).

2000s
Though known for action and thriller genre films, director Rajiv Rai experimented with romantic genre with Pyaar Ishq Aur Mohabbat in 2001; which Viju Shah would compose the musical score for.

Musical Style
Viju Shah primarily composes on a keyboard.

Recent Works
Viju Shah composed the background score for the 2021 Netflix film Class of '83.

Future projects
Viju Shah is collaborating again with Rajiv Rai after 18 year in a suspense thriller titled Zora.

Public personality 
He is known as "The King of Synth Sounds”.

Awards
Won
 1998 – Best Background Score – Gupt: The Hidden Truth

Nominated
 1990 – Best Music Director – Tridev
 1995 – Best Music Director – Mohra
 1997 – Best Music Director – Tere Mere Sapne
 1998 – Best Music Director – Gupt: The Hidden Truth
 1999 – Best Music Director – Bade Miyan Chote Miyan
 1995 – Best Background Score – Andaz Apna Apna
 1993 – Best Background Score – LootereLootere

Discography

References

External links
 

Living people
Filmfare Awards winners
Hindi film score composers
1959 births